is a town located in Yamagata Prefecture, Japan. , the town has an estimated population of 5,205, and a population density of 35 persons per km².

Geography
Kaneyama is located in northeastern Yamagata Prefecture, bordered to the north by Akita Prefecture. The town is at an elevation of between 100 and 400 meters, surrounded by 1000 meter mountains.  The area is known for its extremely heavy snowfalls in winter. There are many osegi waterways running through the town. Part of the town is within the borders of the Kurikoma Quasi-National Park

Neighboring municipalities
Yamagata Prefecture
Shinjō
Sakegawa
Akita Prefecture
Yuzawa

Climate
Kaneyama has a Humid continental climate (Köppen climate classification Dfa) with large seasonal temperature differences, with warm to hot (and often humid) summers and cold (sometimes severely cold) winters. Precipitation is significant throughout the year, but is heaviest from August to October.

Demographics
Per Japanese census data, the population of Kaneyama peaked in the 1950s has been decreasing over the past 70 years. It is now less than it was a century ago.

History
The area of present-day was Kaneyama part of ancient Dewa Province and during the Nara Period and early Heian period was an important fortified point on the road connecting Akita Castle on the Sea of Japan with Tagajo on the Pacific Ocean. During the Sengoku period, the area was under the control of the Mogami clan, who built Kaneyama Castle on what is now the center of the modern town. During the Edo period, the town was a post town on the Ushū Kaidō connecting Edo with what is now Aomori. The mountain passes north of the town center were a battlefield in the Boshin War of the Meiji restoration.  After the start of the Meiji period, the area became part of Mogami District, Yamagata Prefecture. The village of Kaneyama was established on April 1, 1889 with the establishment of the modern municipalities system and was raised to town status on January 1, 1925.

Economy
The main industry is agriculture, livestock and forestry. Kaneyama is particularly famed for its cedar trees, and houses built in the traditional style (with cedar wood and white walls) can be seen around the town. The town is also noted for its production of ornamental (nishiki) koi.

These figures were taken from the 2000 census:

Primary sector (agriculture and forestry)	- 15%

Secondary sector (manufacturing and construction)	- 49%

Tertiary sector (services)	- 36%

Education
Kaneyama has three public elementary schools and one public middle school operated by the city government and one public high schoos operated by the Yamagata Prefectural Board of Education.

Transportation

Railways
Kaneyama does not have any passenger railway service. The nearest Shinkansen station is in neighbouring Shinjō.

Major roads

Local attractions

Isabella Bird Memorial
British explorer Isabella Bird mentioned Kaneyama favourably in her account of her 1878 travels in Japan, Unbeaten Tracks in Japan:

"After leaving Shinjō this morning we crossed over a steep ridge into a singular basin of great beauty, with a semi-circle of pyramidal hills, rendered more striking by being covered to their summits with pyramidal cryptomeria, and apparently blocking all northward progress. At their feet lies Kanayama in a romantic situation, and, though I arrived as early as noon, I am staying for a day or two, for my room at the Transport Office is cheerful and pleasant, the agent is most polite, a very rough region lies before me, and Ito has secured a chicken for the first time since leaving Nikkō!"

A monument commemorating Isabella Bird can be seen in the town centre.

Notable people from Kaneyama
Koichi Kishi, politician

References

External links

Official website 

 
Towns in Yamagata Prefecture